Sieniawa is a village in the administrative district of Gmina Rymanów, within Krosno County, Podkarpackie Province, in south-eastern Poland.

The village has an approximate population of 1,000.

References

Sieniawa